Bunaia is a genus of synziphosurine, a paraphyletic group of fossil chelicerate arthropods. Bunaia was tentatively placed as part of the clade Planaterga. The genus contains at least one species: Bunaia woodwardi from the Silurian period in Svalbard, Norway. Only a few morphological information of B. woodwardi had been confirmed, as the species known only from poorly preserved specimens compose of semicircular carapace, fragments of opisthosoma and disarticulated telson. The placement of "Bunaia" heintzi (known only by a single carapace from the Silurian period in the United States) within this genus had been questioned and required further investigation.

References

Synziphosurina
Silurian first appearances
Silurian arthropods
Fossils of Norway
Fossils of the United States
Fossil taxa described in 1919